The 5th constituency of Alpes-Maritimes is a French legislative constituency that elects one deputy to the National Assembly.It was represented in the XVth legislature by Marine Brenier of the Republicans (LR). It takes in almost the entirety of the Nicois backcountry, and down to the sea to the west of the city of Nice, thus giving it the nickname 'Nice-Mountains'.

Historic Representation

Election results

2022

 
 
 
 
|-
| colspan="8" bgcolor="#E9E9E9"|
|-
 
 

 
 
 
 * Brenier previous stood for LR. The swing from her previous result is counted towards the result of the 2022 candidate for LR.

2017

2012

|- style="background-color:#E9E9E9;text-align:center;"
! colspan="2" rowspan="2" style="text-align:left;" | Candidate
! rowspan="2" colspan="2" style="text-align:left;" | Party
! colspan="2" | 1st round
! colspan="2" | 2nd round
|- style="background-color:#E9E9E9;text-align:center;"
! width="75" | Votes
! width="30" | %
! width="75" | Votes
! width="30" | %
|-
| style="background-color:" |
| style="text-align:left;" | Christian Estrosi
| style="text-align:left;" | Union for a Popular Movement
| UMP
| 
| 44.23%
| 
| 63.41%
|-
| style="background-color:" |
| style="text-align:left;" | Paul Cuturello
| style="text-align:left;" | Socialist Party
| PS
| 
| 25.18%
| 
| 36.59%
|-
| style="background-color:" |
| style="text-align:left;" | Danielle Cardin
| style="text-align:left;" | National Front
| FN
| 
| 21.41%
| colspan="2" style="text-align:left;" |
|-
| style="background-color:" |
| style="text-align:left;" | Emmanuelle Gaziello
| style="text-align:left;" | Left Front
| FG
| 
| 3.94%
| colspan="2" style="text-align:left;" |
|-
| style="background-color:" |
| style="text-align:left;" | Gildas Dupré
| style="text-align:left;" | 
| CEN
| 
| 1.32%
| colspan="2" style="text-align:left;" |
|-
| style="background-color:" |
| style="text-align:left;" | Brigitte Ballouard
| style="text-align:left;" | Ecologist
| ECO
| 
| 1.25%
| colspan="2" style="text-align:left;" |
|-
| style="background-color:" |
| style="text-align:left;" | Florence Ciaravola
| style="text-align:left;" | Far Left
| EXG
| 
| 0.96%
| colspan="2" style="text-align:left;" |
|-
| style="background-color:" |
| style="text-align:left;" | Axel Hvidsten
| style="text-align:left;" | Ecologist
| ECO
| 
| 0.68%
| colspan="2" style="text-align:left;" |
|-
| style="background-color:" |
| style="text-align:left;" | Anthony Mitrano
| style="text-align:left;" | Miscellaneous Right
| DVD
| 
| 0.62%
| colspan="2" style="text-align:left;" |
|-
| style="background-color:" |
| style="text-align:left;" | Jean-Pierre Pisoni
| style="text-align:left;" | Far Left
| EXG
| 
| 0.27%
| colspan="2" style="text-align:left;" |
|-
| style="background-color:" |
| style="text-align:left;" | Jean-Marie Alexandre
| style="text-align:left;" | Far Left
| EXG
| 
| 0.15%
| colspan="2" style="text-align:left;" |
|-
| colspan="8" style="background-color:#E9E9E9;"|
|- style="font-weight:bold"
| colspan="4" style="text-align:left;" | Total
| 
| 100%
| 
| 100%
|-
| colspan="8" style="background-color:#E9E9E9;"|
|-
| colspan="4" style="text-align:left;" | Registered voters
| 
| style="background-color:#E9E9E9;"|
| 
| style="background-color:#E9E9E9;"|
|-
| colspan="4" style="text-align:left;" | Blank/Void ballots
| 
| 1.21%
| 
| 4.19%
|-
| colspan="4" style="text-align:left;" | Turnout
| 
| 58.45%
| 
| 53.99%
|-
| colspan="4" style="text-align:left;" | Abstentions
| 
| 41.55%
| 
| 46.01%
|-
| colspan="8" style="background-color:#E9E9E9;"|
|- style="font-weight:bold"
| colspan="6" style="text-align:left;" | Result
| colspan="2" style="background-color:" | UMP HOLD
|}

2007

2002

 
 
 
 
 
|-
| colspan="8" bgcolor="#E9E9E9"|
|-

1997

 
 
 
 
 
 
|-
| colspan="8" bgcolor="#E9E9E9"|
|-

References

Sources
Results at the Ministry of the Interior (French)

5